For information on all Lamar University sports, see Lamar Cardinals and Lady Cardinals

The 1982–83 Lamar Cardinals basketball team represented Lamar University during the 1982–83 NCAA Division I men's basketball season. The Cardinals were led by third-year head coach Pat Foster and played their home games at the Beaumont Civic Center in Beaumont, Texas as members of the Southland Conference.  The Cardinals won the regular season conference championship and the 1983 Southland Conference men's basketball tournament.  They received an automatic invitation to the 1983 NCAA Division I men's basketball tournament where they defeated Alabama in the first round and lost to Villanova in the second round. Lamar finished the season with a record of 23–8 (9–3 Southland).

Roster 
Sources:

Schedule and results
Sources:

|-
!colspan=12 style=| Non-conference regular season

|-
!colspan=12 style=| Southland regular season

|-
!colspan=12 style=| Southland tournament

|-
!colspan=12 style=| NCAA Division I men's basketball tournament

References

Lamar Cardinals basketball seasons
Lamar
Lamar
Lamar Cardinals basketball
Lamar Cardinals basketball